Kevin Gaines (born August 7, 1971, in Euclid, Ohio) is an Arena Football League Defensive Specialist for the Philadelphia Soul, recently signed from the Georgia Force where he played for three seasons and was named Second Team All-Arena in 2004 and 2005. He previously played for the Orlando Predators, the New Jersey Red Dogs/Gladiators, the Florida Bobcats, the Carolina Cobras and the Grand Rapids Rampage. He also played for the London Monarchs in the World League of American Football. Despite Kevin Gaine's time as an Orlando Predator, he has no professional NFL experience.

College years 
Gaines attended University of Louisville, and was a student and a letterman in football. In football, as a senior, Gaines was named Louisville's Defensive Player of the Year and was a second team All-America pick, and after his senior season, participated in the Senior Bowl.

External links 
 Kevin Gaines at ArenaFan Online

1971 births
Living people
People from Euclid, Ohio
African-American players of American football
American football defensive linemen
Louisville Cardinals football players
Orlando Predators players
New Jersey Red Dogs players
New Jersey Gladiators players
Florida Bobcats players
Carolina Cobras players
Georgia Force players
Philadelphia Soul players
Grand Rapids Rampage players
London Monarchs players